Västerås IK Fotboll is a Swedish football club located in Västerås.

Background
Since their foundation in 1913, Västerås IK has participated mainly in the middle divisions of the Swedish football league system.  Their peak came early in the club's history when Västerås IK competed in the inaugural 1924–25 Allsvenskan season.  The club's stay in the top tier was short-lived, however, and they were relegated at the end of the season having won only two games.  , the club plays in Division 2 Norra Svealand, which is the fourth tier of Swedish football. They play their home matches at the Apalby IP in Västerås.

Västerås IK are affiliated to the Västmanlands Fotbollförbund.

Season to season

In their early seasons Västerås IK competed in the following divisions:

In recent seasons Västerås IK Fotboll have competed in the following divisions:

Attendances

In recent seasons Västerås IK Fotboll have had the following average attendances:

The attendance record for Västerås IK was 3,924 spectators for the match against Sandvikens IF in Division 2 Norra on 16 September 1945.

External links
 Västerås IK – Official Website

Footnotes

Sport in Västerås
Football clubs in Västmanland County
Association football clubs established in 1913
1913 establishments in Sweden

pt:Västerås IK